The Scottville Public Library is a branch or division of the Mason County District Library administrative board. The first librarian was Ruth VanderMolen. The second librarian was Robert Dickson.

History
The Scottville Public Library has its roots from 1899 when a retired local banker, Charles Blain, donated a lot for the library on South Main Street in Scottville. Money to construct a building for use on that lot was raised by hosting public fund-raising events and by starting a subscription service. The first building which stood in the lot was the Blain Reading Association, named after Charles Blain.

The library existed in this location until 1940 when it was sold and a new building was constructed. The library shared this new building with another company, and at the time was situated on the second floor.

References

External links
Scottville Public Library
Mason County District Library

1956 establishments in Michigan
Public libraries in Michigan
Buildings and structures in Mason County, Michigan
Education in Mason County, Michigan
Libraries established in 1956